is a Japanese footballer who plays for Albirex Niigata Singapore FC as a midfielder.

Club career

Albirex Niigata (S)
Ryo Nakano  signed for Albirex Niigata Singapore FC from FC TIAMO Hirakata for 2019 season

Career statistics

Club

References

External links

1999 births
Living people
Association football forwards
Japanese footballers
Japanese expatriate footballers
Expatriate footballers in Singapore
Japanese expatriate sportspeople in Singapore
Tokai University alumni
Albirex Niigata Singapore FC players
Singapore Premier League players